Landau Eugene Murphy Jr. (born August 11, 1974) is an American jazz singer from Logan County, West Virginia. He received national attention for winning the sixth season of the NBC reality show America's Got Talent. Landau has released a total of 4 albums since his victory in 2011. Landau used his free time during the COVID-19 pandemic to earn his high school diploma and serves as an advocate for adult education in the state of West Virginia with the West Virginia Department of Education's "It's Never Too Late to Graduate" campaign. Landau continues to advocate for adult education, offering the official Landau Eugene Murphy Jr. Scholarship at Southern West Virginia Community and Technical College in his hometown of Logan, West Virginia. Following his time on America's Got Talent, Landau has continued to host a series of charity events around the state of West Virginia. Landau has since performed around the world, having played in Shanghai, China in 2013 and at the World Expo in Dubai in 2022. Landau continues to perform around the country annually and wraps up every year with a Holiday tour across his home state. In 2014 Landau was listed in the Jaycees Ten Outstanding Young Americans list.

Early life 
Murphy dropped out of high school during his 11th grade year, for 20 years he financially struggled as he drifted between different jobs between Detroit, Michigan and West Virginia. Before his time on television, in 2010 Landau's house was ransacked, leading him to audition for America's Got Talent in the only clothes he owned.

America's Got Talent
In November 2010, Murphy traveled to New York City for the audition. He was selected as the winner of the show on September 14, 2011, after a performance of "My Way", a song popularized by Frank Sinatra. He won the $1 million grand prize and began a headlining act in Las Vegas on October 28.

Performances and results

Career

That's Life
After winning, Murphy signed to Sony Records and Columbia Records, and released his first album That's Life on November 21, 2011. The album debuted at No. 34 on the Billboard 200, selling 28,000 copies, then fell to No. 41 the next week on the charts. It debuted at number one on the Billboard jazz charts, and also reached No. 1 in the Jazz category on Amazon.com. By May 2017, the album had sold 156,000 copies.

Many have compared Murphy's vocals and phrasing to that of Frank Sinatra, a singer he has always admired. Many of the tracks from That's Life are Sinatra standards. Murphy said of the album, "For a lot of music fans, especially older people, I can bring back some happy memories. And hopefully I can create new memories for generations to come."

That's Life was produced by Steve Tyrell, himself an aficionado of Sinatra's music.

Live performances
As part of his AGT prize, Murphy headlined a show at the Colosseum Theater at Caesars Palace in Las Vegas. Other tour stops include the Apollo Theater in New York, the DTE Energy Center in Detroit with The Temptations, headlining appearances at the West Virginia and California State Fairs, a Super Bowl appearance, a televised performance at The Hollywood Christmas Parade and a string of sold-out headlining shows across the USA (many supporting local charities). Major media appearances have included The Today Show, Anderson Cooper, The View, The Talk, The Wendy Williams Show, Fox and Friends, CNN, The Tom Joyner Show, Scott and Todd on WPLJ, and Good Day LA, among others.

He has also sung the national anthem at Madison Square Garden, WVU's Mountaineer Field, prior to a West Virginia University/LSU matchup and at several other public events. In 2017, he continues to give concerts

Education Advocacy 
Landau used his free time during the COVID-19 pandemic to earn his high school diploma and serves as an advocate for adult education in the state of West Virginia with the West Virginia Department of Education's "It's Never Too Late to Graduate" campaign. Landau continues to advocate for adult education, offering the official Landau Eugene Murphy Jr. Scholarship at Southern West Virginia Community and Technical College in his hometown of Logan, West Virginia.

Charity Work 
Following his time on America's Got Talent, Landau has continued to host a series of charity events around the state of West Virginia. In 2014 Landau was listed in the Jaycees Ten Outstanding Young Americans list.

Discography

Singles

Albums

References

External links
Official website
Interview with NPR's All Things Considered

1974 births
21st-century American singers
20th-century African-American male singers
American crooners
America's Got Talent winners
American jazz singers
Crooners
Living people
Participants in American reality television series
People from Chapmanville, West Virginia
Singers from West Virginia
21st-century American male singers
American male jazz musicians
21st-century African-American male singers